Blackpool North was a borough constituency in Lancashire which returned one Member of Parliament to the House of Commons of the Parliament of the United Kingdom.

It was created for the 1945 general election, when the former constituency of Blackpool was split in two, and abolished for the 1997 general election. It was then largely replaced by the new Blackpool North & Fleetwood constituency.

Boundaries 
1945–1950: The County Borough of Blackpool wards of Alexandra, Bank Hey, Bispham, Brunswick, Claremont, Foxhall, Layton, Talbot, Tyldesley, and Warbreck.

1950–1983: The County Borough of Blackpool wards of Bank Hey, Bispham, Brunswick, Claremont, Foxhall, Layton, Talbot, and Warbreck.

1983–1997: The Borough of Blackpool wards of Anchorsholme, Bispham, Brunswick, Claremont, Greenlands, Ingthorpe, Layton, Norbreck, Park, Talbot, and Warbreck.

Members of Parliament

Elections

Elections in the 1940s

Elections in the 1950s

Elections in the 1960s

Elections in the 1970s

Elections in the 1980s

Elections in the 1990s

See also 
List of parliamentary constituencies in Lancashire
The town of Blackpool

Notes and references

Sources
F. W. S. Craig, British Parliamentary Election Results 1950–73

Parliamentary constituencies in North West England (historic)
Constituencies of the Parliament of the United Kingdom established in 1945
Constituencies of the Parliament of the United Kingdom disestablished in 1997
Politics of Blackpool